Bedtime for Bonzo is a 1951 American comedy film directed by Fred de Cordova and starring Ronald Reagan, Diana Lynn, and a chimpanzee named Tamba as Bonzo. Its central character, psychology professor Peter Boyd (Reagan), tries to teach human morals to a chimpanzee, hoping to solve the "nature versus nurture" question. Boyd hires Jane Linden (Lynn) to pose as the chimpanzee's mother while he plays father to it and uses 1950s-era child-rearing techniques.

A sequel was released titled Bonzo Goes to College (1952), but it featured none of the three lead performers from the original film. Tamba, who had also appeared in My Friend Irma Goes West (1950), died in a fire on March 4, 1951, so another chimpanzee was hired for the second film. Reagan did not want to appear in the second film as he thought that the premise was unbelievable.

Plot
Valerie, a college dean’s daughter, is engaged to the dean's colleague Peter, a psychology professor. When the dean discovers that Peter is the son of a former criminal, he forbids the marriage, declaring Peter’s blood to be tainted, in line with his strong belief in heredity as an influence on character. As Peter believes equally strongly in the opposite theory of environment, he aims to prove that he can raise a chimpanzee as one would a human child in a law-abiding household.

After acquiring a chimpanzee named Bonzo from an animal handler, Peter recruits a nanny named Jane, and they act as Bonzo's parents, teaching him good habits. Bonzo inadvertently turns on the vacuum cleaner and leaps out of the window in alarm, climbing a tree, where Jane follows him. Bonzo jumps back into the house and dials the emergency services as he has been instructed to do, but he then returns to the tree and removes the ladder, leaving Jane stranded until Peter can help her. Valerie arrives on the scene just as the firemen are helping them down and misreads the situation, angrily returning Peter’s ring.

The dean warns that Bonzo is to be sold to Yale University for medical research, and Jane overhears Peter and the animal handler discussing the imminent end of the experiment. As she has developed romantic feelings for Peter, Jane is so shocked that she allows Bonzo to escape on his tricycle. Peter follows him to a jewelry store, where Bonzo grabs a necklace. When Bonzo refuses to return it, Peter tries to do so himself, only to be arrested by the cops. When Jane instructs Bonzo to surrender the necklace as he has been taught, he obediently returns to the store and replaces it where he had found it in the window. With the experiment judged a success, the dean decides not to sell Bonzo and bestows his blessing on the upcoming marriage.

Cast
 Ronald Reagan as Professor Peter Boyd
 Diana Lynn as Jane
 Walter Slezak as Professor Hans Neumann
 Lucille Barkley as Valerie Tillinghast
 Jesse White as Babcock
 Herbert Heyes as Dean Tillinghast
 Herb Vigran as Lt. Daggett
 Harry Tyler as Knucksy
 Ed Clark as Foskick (as Ed Gargan)
 Edward Gargan as Policeman (as Ed Gargan)
 Joel Friedkin as Mr. De Witt
 Brad Browne as Chief of Police
 Elizabeth Flournoy as Miss Swithen (as Elizabeth Flourney)
 Howard Banks as Policeman 
 Perc Launders as Fireman
 Brad Johnson as Student
 Billy Mauch as Student (as Billy Mauch)
 Ann Tyrrell as Telephone Operator
 Peggy as Bonzo

Production
During production Reagan was nearly suffocated by the chimpanzee when it pulled on Reagan's necktie. After he broke free the tie had to be cut off Reagan's neck by a crewmember.

Reception
A. H. Weiler of The New York Times called the film "a minor bit of fun yielding a respectable amount of laughs but nothing, actually, over which to wax ecstatic." Variety described it as "a lot of beguiling nonsense with enough broad situations to gloss over plot holes ... Cameras wisely linger on the chimp's sequences and his natural antics are good for plenty of laughter." Richard L. Coe of The Washington Post wrote, "If you can stomach all this, you'll find some giggles in this farce, which is okay when paying attention to the recently deceased chimp, but is perfectly terrible when trying to tell its story. Ronald Reagan, as the naive professor of things mental, must have felt like the world's sappiest straight man playing this silly role, and the others aren't much better off."

On the review aggregator website Rotten Tomatoes, the film holds an approval rating of 67%, based on 12 reviews, with an average rating of 5.83/10.

As president, Reagan screened the film for staff and guests at Camp David.

In popular culture

In music
 A song unflattering to Reagan entitled "Bad Time for Bonzo" is featured on the Damned's fourth studio album, Strawberries (1982).
 A track on a 1984 Jerry Harrison record samples Reagan and is credited to "Bonzo Goes to Washington"
 The film was later referenced in connection with Reagan in the 1986 Ramones song "My Brain Is Hanging Upside Down (Bonzo Goes to Bitburg)".
 The film is referenced by the Dead Kennedys' 1986 song "Rambozo the Clown" on the titularly inspired album Bedtime for Democracy.
 A song released by Nickelodeon for the 2004 United States presidential election had a line mentioning that Reagan "acted with a chimp when he was a movie star".

In other media
The film was also referenced in a Calvin and Hobbes comic strip, Bloom County comic strip (October 11, 1981), as well as in the Strontium Dog comic story "Bitch", published in 2000 AD, which featured President Reagan being kidnapped out of his own era and taken into the far-future setting of the comic. Other notable references include the 1966 Stan Freberg comedy album Freberg Underground, and the 1986 video of the British band Genesis's song "Land of Confusion". In the 1980s satirical British TV show Spitting Image, Reagan was shown as having appointed a dead taxidermied Bonzo as vice president. In the ALF episode "Pennsylvania 6-5000", ALF is concerned about nuclear war, calls Air Force One over a shortwave radio and tells the president that he wants to talk to him about his [nuclear] bombs. Reagan misinterprets this to mean the Bedtime for Bonzo film.

The film was shown during a scene in Harry and the Hendersons, which the titular Bigfoot character thought hilarious.

The film was also referenced in the second season of the FX television series Fargo, when the character Karl Weathers (played by Nick Offerman) says that he will not shake Reagan's hand, because he "made a movie with a monkey, it wouldn't be dignified".

In the 2017 film War for the Planet of the Apes, some human soldiers have phrases written on their helmets, including "Bedtime for Bonzo".

In the final scene of the final episode of Season 3 of 12 Monkeys, James Cole's father tells the young James, "bed time for Bonzo".

Throughout director Fred de Cordova's career as producer of The Tonight Show Starring Johnny Carson, Carson and guests would make frequent jokes and references to Bedtime for Bonzo when Reagan became president.

In the 1970s Universal Television series The Night Stalker, the show's episode number 11, "Horror In the Heights", features INS editor Tony Vincenzo (Simon Oakland) screaming to reporter Carl Kolchak (Darren McGavin) about a Kolchak story that he refuses to publish: "As far as I'm concerned, it's Bedtime for Bonzo!!"

References

External links
 
 
 
 

1951 films
1951 comedy films
American comedy films
American black-and-white films
Films about apes
Films directed by Frederick de Cordova
Universal Pictures films
Individual chimpanzees
Films scored by Frank Skinner
1950s English-language films
1950s American films